In statistics, the projection matrix , sometimes also called the influence matrix or hat matrix , maps the vector of response values (dependent variable values) to the vector of fitted values (or predicted values). It describes the influence each response value has on each fitted value. The diagonal elements of the projection matrix are the leverages, which describe the influence each response value has on the fitted value for that same observation.

Definition

As  is usually pronounced "y-hat", the projection matrix  is also named hat matrix as it "puts a hat on ". 

Application for residuals
The formula for the vector of residuals  can also be expressed compactly using the projection matrix:

where  is the identity matrix. The matrix  is sometimes referred to as the residual maker matrix or the annihilator matrix. 

The covariance matrix of the residuals , by error propagation, equals
, 
where  is the covariance matrix of the error vector (and by extension, the response vector as well).
.

Intuition

A vector that is orthogonal to the column space of a matrix is in the nullspace of the matrix transpose, so 

From there, one rearranges, so 

Linear model 
Suppose that we wish to estimate a linear model using linear least squares. The model can be written as

where  is a matrix of explanatory variables (the design matrix), β is a vector of unknown parameters to be estimated, and ε is the error vector.

Many types of models and techniques are subject to this formulation. A few examples are linear least squares, smoothing splines, regression splines, local regression, kernel regression, and linear filtering.

Ordinary least squares 

When the weights for each observation are identical and the errors are uncorrelated, the estimated parameters are

so the fitted values are

Therefore, the projection matrix (and hat matrix) is given by

Weighted and generalized least squares 

The above may be generalized to the cases where the weights are not identical and/or the errors are correlated.  Suppose that the covariance matrix of the errors is Σ.  Then since

 .

the hat matrix is thus

 

and again it may be seen that , though now it is no longer symmetric.

Properties  
The projection matrix has a number of useful algebraic properties. In the language of linear algebra, the projection matrix is the orthogonal projection onto the column space of the design matrix . (Note that  is the pseudoinverse of X.) Some facts of the projection matrix in this setting are summarized as follows:
  and 
 The eigenvalues of  consist of r ones and  zeros, while the eigenvalues of  consist of  ones and r zeros.
  is invariant under  :  hence .
 
  is unique for certain subspaces.
The projection matrix corresponding to a linear model is symmetric and idempotent, that is, . However, this is not always the case; in locally weighted scatterplot smoothing (LOESS), for example, the hat matrix is in general neither symmetric nor idempotent.

For other models such as LOESS that are still linear in the observations , the projection matrix can be used to define the effective degrees of freedom of the model.

Practical applications of the projection matrix in regression analysis include leverage and Cook's distance, which are concerned with identifying influential observations, i.e. observations which have a large effect on the results of a regression.

Blockwise formula 

Then the projection matrix can be decomposed as follows:

There are a number of applications of such a decomposition. In the classical application  is a column of all ones, which allows one to analyze the effects of adding an intercept term to a regression. Another use is in the fixed effects model, where  is a large sparse matrix of the dummy variables for the fixed effect terms. One can use this partition to compute the hat matrix of  without explicitly forming the matrix , which might be too large to fit into computer memory.

See also 
 Projection (linear algebra)
 Studentized residuals
 Effective degrees of freedom
 Mean and predicted response

References 

Regression analysis
Matrices